Acqui Football Club is an Italian association football club, based in Acqui Terme, Piedmont. Currently it plays in Eccellenza.

History 
Founded in 1911 on the initiative of three gymnastics clubs of the termale town (The Bagni, Arte et Marte and Acqui Club), the U.S. Acqui experienced its most successful period in the years following the founding: came to play in the Campionato Nazionale 1914–15, the last stop before the championship. It spent the next decades in Division I and Serie C, after World War II took part in mostly lower tournaments.

The club returned to Serie D in 2009–10 season after winning Eccellenza Piedmont and Aosta Valley Girone B.

In the 2011–12 season Acqui finished in 15th place in Serie D Girone A.

In summer 2012 it was excluded from Covisod for lack of documentation for to play in 2012–13 Serie D. On 23 August 2012, the club was admitted in surplus in Eccellenza Piedmont and Aosta Valley/B. Finally it went bankrupt in 2017 and its assets were bought by a minor town club which became the new Acqui FC.

Colors and badge 
The team's colors are white and black.

References

Football clubs in Piedmont and Aosta Valley
Association football clubs established in 1911
1911 establishments in Italy
Serie D clubs
Phoenix clubs (association football)